Loveland were an English house music group, formed in 1994 by Mark Hadfield, Paul Taylor and Paul Waterman.

The group scored several dance hits in the UK in the mid-1990s, and released one album, 1995's The Wonder of Love. Rachel McFarlane was the group's 'featured' lead vocalist, and was often co-credited on their releases (as Loveland featuring Rachel McFarlane). All three of the other members did extensive work as remixers for many major artists including the likes of Kylie Minogue, Donna Summer, C+C Music Factory, Culture Beat and many more. They also run the Eastern Bloc record label which they released their records on.

Singles
"Let the Music (Lift You Up)" (1994) UK #16, U.S. Dance #19
"(Keep On) Shining/Hope (Never Give Up)" (1994) UK #37
"I Need Somebody" (1995) UK #21 
"Don't Make Me Wait" (1995) UK #22
"The Wonder of Love" (1995) UK #53
"I Need Somebody" (remix) (1995) UK #38

References

English house music groups
English electronic music groups
Musical groups established in 1994
British musical trios